Oleksiy Kikireshko (born February 20, 1977, in Bilhorod-Dnistrovsky, in the Ukrainian SSR of the Soviet Union – in present-day Ukraine) is a rally driver from Ukraine. In 2011, Kikireshko contests in the Production World Rally Championship (PWRC) with the Mentos Ascania Racing Team driving a Mitsubishi Lancer Evo IX.

Also from 2014 he began a professional association football career as a striker for FC Arsenal Kyiv.

WRC results

PWRC results

WRC-2 results

References

External links

 eWRC-results.com profile
 
 

1977 births
Living people
People from Bilhorod-Dnistrovskyi
World Rally Championship drivers
Ukrainian rally drivers
Ukrainian philanthropists
Ukrainian footballers
FC Arsenal Kyiv
FC Arsenal Kyiv players
Ukrainian First League players
Ukrainian Second League players
Ukrainian football chairmen and investors
Association football forwards

Nürburgring 24 Hours drivers
Ukrainian racing drivers